Sumarsam (born 27 July 1944) is a Javanese musician and scholar of the gamelan.

Life
Sumarsam was born in Dander, Bojonegoro, East Java, Indonesia. He first performed gamelan at the age of seven. He began his formal gamelan education in 1961 at the Konservatori Karawitan Indonesia (KOKAR, now Sekolah Menengah Karawitan Indonesia) in Surakarta. He graduated in 1964 and began to teach, and in 1965 began to study at the newly opened Akademi Seni Karawitan Indonesia (ASKI, now Sekolah Tinggi Seni Indonesia in Surakarta). He graduated in 1968 and did some co-teaching with Martopangrawit. ASKI participated in government programs to promote Indonesian culture abroad, and in 1970 Sumarsam was invited to Expo '70 in Osaka, Japan, where he worked seven months. In 1971 he was invited to teach at the Indonesian Embassy in Canberra, Australia. Afterwards he moved to the United States to become a visiting artist at Wesleyan University.

Inspired by Western academia, he pursued a master's degree in world music from Wesleyan University from 1974 to 1976. He graduated with the thesis "Inner Melody in Javanese Gamelan." He continued teaching and performing at various universities in the United States, and was made an artist-in-residence at Wesleyan in 1976.

From 1983 he began working on a Ph.D. from Cornell University in ethnomusicology and Southeast Asian Studies. His thesis was "Historical Contexts and Theories of Javanese Music." It was later revised and published as Gamelan: Cultural Interaction and Musical Development in Central Java.

He was made adjunct professor at Wesleyan in 1992, University Professor in 2011, and Professor of Music in 2016, where he now (2017) serves as Winslow-Kaplan Professor of Music. In September 2017, the Indonesian Ministry of Education and Culture is honoring him with a Cultural and Traditional Arts Maestro Award (Satyalancana Kebudayaan).

Publications

References

Sumarsam. Gamelan: Cultural Interaction and Musical Development in Central Java. The preface contains autobiographical details.

External links
 at Wesleyan University

1944 births
Gamelan musicians
Indonesian traditional musicians
Cornell University alumni
Living people
Ethnomusicologists
Wesleyan University faculty
Wesleyan University alumni
People from Bojonegoro Regency